Hottingen may refer to:

Hottingen, Rickenbach, Rickenbach, Baden-Württemberg, Germany
Hottingen (Zürich), Canton of Zürich, Switzerland

See also
 Höttingen, a municipality in the Weißenburg-Gunzenhausen district, Bavaria, Germany